The 2007–08 Slovenian Hockey League season was the 17th season in Slovenia. The competition was mostly made up of teams from Slovenia, but there was one team from Croatia too.

At the end of the regular season the playoffs, also known as the Slovenian Hockey Championship, was held. Despite qualifying for it, Croatian Medveščak was not allowed to participate because the Championship was open only to Slovenian teams. In the end Jesenice won the title, going undefeated in the play-offs.

Teams

 Alfa
 Bled
 HDD Olimpija (play-offs only)
 HK Olimpija
 Jesenice (play-offs only)
 Maribor
 Medveščak
 Mladi Jesenice
 Slavija
 Triglav Kranj

Standings after regular season

Play-offs

Quarter-finals
Jesenice defeated Bled 2–0 in a best of three series.
Jesenice – Bled 7–1 (2–1, 2–0, 3–0)
Bled – Jesenice 2–15 (0–2, 1–6, 1–7)

HDD Olimpija defeated HK Olimpija 2–0 in a best of three series.
HDD Olimpija – HK Olimpija 9–1 (2–0, 2–0, 5–1)
HK Olimpija – HDD Olimpija 2–6 (1–2, 1–3, 0–1)

Mladi Jesenice defeated Triglav in a best of three series.
Mladi Jesenice – Triglav 2–1 (1–0, 1–0, 0–1)
Triglav – Mladi Jesenice 2–1 (0–0, 0–1, 2–0)
Mladi Jesenice – Triglav 6–1 (2–1, 1–0, 3–0)

Maribor defeated Slavija 2–1 in a best of three series.
Slavija – Maribor 1–5 (0–0, 1–3, 0–2)
Maribor – Slavija 1–3 (1–1, 0–1, 0–1)
Slavija – Maribor 2–4 (0–1, 0–2, 2–1)

Semi-finals
Jesenice defeated Maribor 2–0 in a best of three series.
Jesenice – Maribor 1–0 (0–0, 0–0, 1–0) 
Maribor – Jesenice 1–8 (1–0, 0–3, 0–5)

Olimpija defeated Mladi Jesenice 2–1 in a best of three series.
Olimpija – Mladi Jesenice 4–3 (1–2, 3–1, 0–0)
Mladi Jesenice – Olimpija 4–3 (1–1, 1–1, 2–1)
Olimpija – Mladi Jesenice 4–0 (1–0, 2–0, 1–0)

Final
Jesenice defeated Olimpija 4–0 in a best of seven series.
Jesenice – Olimpija 6–2 (1–1, 4–0, 1–1) 
Jesenice – Olimpija 6–1 (2–1, 3–0, 1–0)
Olimpija – Jesenice 1–2 (1–1, 0–1, 0–0)
Olimpija – Jesenice 1–2 (0–2, 1–0, 0–0)

1
Slovenia
Slovenian Ice Hockey League seasons